Mary Anne Butler is an Australian playwright living in Darwin in the Northern Territory.

In 2016 she won the $100,000 Victorian Premier's Literary Awards for literature for her play Broken. It was the first time a script had won the award. Broken also won a Northern Territory Literary Award for best playscript in 2014.

In June 2014, Butler was awarded a Churchill Fellowship to study theatre practice in Dublin, Ireland.

Bibliography 

 2014 - Broken
 2014 - Highway of Lost Hearts
 2012 - Hopetown
 2010 - Dragons
 2009 - Half Way There

References

External links 
 Official website

Living people
Year of birth missing (living people)
Australian women dramatists and playwrights